Stadion (Greek , Latin stadium, nominative plural stadia in both Greek and Latin) may refer to:

People
 Christoph von Stadion (1478–1543), Prince-Bishop of Augsburg
 Johann Philipp Stadion, Count von Warthausen (1763–1824), Austrian statesman
 Franz Stadion, Count von Warthausen (1806–1853), Austrian statesman, son of the previous
 Franz Konrad von Stadion und Thannhausen (1679–1757), Prince-Bishop of Bamberg
 Philipp von Stadion und Thannhausen (1799–1868), Austrian field marshal

Stadiums
 Stadion Lohmühle, a multi-use stadium in Lübeck, Germany
 Stockholm Olympic Stadium, commonly referred to as "Stadion," a stadium in  Stockholm, Sweden

Train stations
 Stadion metro station, a metro station in Stockholm, Sweden
 Stadion (Vienna U-Bahn), a metro station in Vienna, Austria

Other
 Stadion (journal), a multilingual academic journal covering the history of sport
 Stadion (running race), an ancient Greek running event, part of the Olympic Games and other Panhellenic Games, and the name of the building in which it took place
 Stadion (state), a county of the Holy Roman Empire
 Stadion (unit), Latinized as stadium, an ancient unit of length, formerly anglicized as stade

See also 
 
 Stadia (disambiguation)
 Stadium (disambiguation)
 Stade (disambiguation)